This is a list of novelists from England writing for adults and young adults. Please add only one novel title or comment on fiction per name. Other genres appear in other lists and on subject's page. References appear on the individual pages.

A

B

C

D

E

F

G

H

I

J

K

L

M

N

O

P

Q

R

S

T

U

V

W

Y

Z

See also
List of English writers
List of novelists

References

 
Novelists
English